Below is a list of the titles that the Sydney Roosters have received since 1908.

Major Titles

Premierships – 15

Runners-up – 15

Minor Premierships – 20

World Club Challenge – 5

NRLW Premierships – 1

NRLW Runners-up – 2

NRLW Minor Premierships – 1

Youth/Friendly Titles

Club Championship – 131930, 1931, 1934, 1935, 1936, 1937, 1945, 1970, 1974, 1975, 2004, 2013, 2014

Reserve Grade – 91908, 1909, 1910, 1911, 1935, 1937, 1949, 1986, 2004

Third Grade/Under 23 – 111914, 1917, 1924, 1929, 1930, 1931, 1932, 1941, 1947, 1970, 1976

National Youth Competition – 12016

Jersey Flegg Cup – 31995, 2002, 2004

Presidents Cup – 161910, 1911, 1913, 1915, 1920, 1922, 1923, 1924, 1927, 1938, 1948, 1949, 1955, 1978, 1987, 1993

S. G. Ball Cup – 41997, 2008, 2010, 2014

Amco Cup – 21975, 1978

City Cup – 31914, 1915, 1916

Pre-Season Cup – 41974, 1977, 1979, 1981

Auckland Nines – 12017

World Sevens – 11993

Individual Titles

Hall of Fame

Player of the Year

Jack Gibson Medal

Rothmans Medal

Provan-Summons Medal

Dally M Medal

Dally M Fullback of the Year

Dally M Winger of the Year

Dally M Centre of the Year

Dally M Five-Eighth of the Year

Dally M Halfback of the Year

Dally M Prop of the Year

Dally M Hooker of the Year

Dally M Second-Rower of the Year

Dally M Rookie of the Year

Dally M Coach of the Year

Clive Churchill Medal

See also

References

External links

Honours
Rugby league trophies and awards
National Rugby League lists
Sydney-sport-related lists